Walter Latter Cornford (25 December 1900 – 6 February 1964) was an English cricketer. He was a wicket-keeper who played in 4 Tests in New Zealand in 1930 and played county cricket for Sussex County Cricket Club. His nickname of Tich alluded to his height of barely five feet.

His county career stretched from 1921 until the outbreak of the Second World War, but he made one further appearance in an emergency at the age of 46 in 1947.

References

External links

England Test cricketers
English cricketers
Sussex cricketers
Marylebone Cricket Club cricketers
1900 births
1964 deaths
Players cricketers
English cricketers of 1919 to 1945
People from Rother District
Wicket-keepers